In mathematics, a Leavitt path algebra is a universal algebra constructed from a directed graph.  The Leavitt path algebras generalize the Leavitt algebras and may also be considered as algebraic analogues of the graph C*-algebras.  Leavitt path algebras were simultaneously introduced in 2005 by Gene Abrams and Gonzalo Aranda Pino as well as by Pere Ara, María Moreno, and Enrique Pardo, with neither of the two groups aware of the other's work.  Leavitt path algebras have been investigated by dozens of mathematicians since their introduction, and in 2020 Leavitt path algebras were added to the Mathematics Subject Classification with code 16S88 under the general discipline of Associative Rings and Algebras. The basic reference for this topic is the book by Gene Abrams, Pere Ara and Mercedes Siles Molina, Leavitt path algebras.

Graph terminology
The theory of Leavitt path algebras uses terminology for graphs similar to that of C*-algebraists, which differs slightly from that used by graph theorists. The term graph is typically taken to mean a directed graph  consisting of a countable set of vertices , a countable set of edges , and maps  identifying the range and source of each edge, respectively. A vertex is called a singular vertex if it is either a sink or an infinite emitter, and a vertex is called a regular vertex if it is not a singular vertex. A graph is called row-finite if it has no infinite emitters; i.e., if every vertex is either a regular vertex or a sink.

A cycle  is called a simple cycle if  for all .

The following are two important graph conditions that arise in the study of Leavitt path algebras.

Condition (L):  Every cycle in the graph has an exit.

Condition (K): There is no vertex in the graph that is on exactly one simple cycle.  Equivalently, a graph satisfies Condition (K) if and only if each vertex in the graph is either on no cycles or on two or more simple cycles.

The Cuntz–Krieger relations and the universal property
Fix a field .  A Cuntz–Krieger -family is a collection  in a -algebra such that the following three relations (called the Cuntz–Krieger relations) are satisfied:

 (CK0)  for all ,
 (CK1)  for all ,
 (CK2)  whenever  is a regular vertex, and
 (CK3)  for all .

Using the Cuntz–Krieger relations, one can show that 

Moreover, one can show that for any graph , the Leavitt path algebra  is isomorphic to a dense *-subalgebra of the graph C*-algebra .

Examples
Leavitt path algebras has been computed for many graphs, and the following table shows some particular graphs and their Leavitt path algebras.  We use the convention that a double arrow drawn from one vertex to another and labeled  indicates that there are a countably infinite number of edges from the first vertex to the second.

Correspondence between graph and algebraic properties

The following table provides a short list of some of the more well-known equivalences.  The reader may wish to compare this table with the corresponding table for graph C*-algebras.

The grading
For each integer  we define . One can show that this defines a -grading on the Leavitt path algebra  and that  with  being the component of homogeneous elements of degree . It is important to note that the grading depends on the choice of the generating Cuntz-Krieger -family .

The uniqueness theorems
There are two well-known uniqueness theorems for Leavitt path algebras: the graded uniqueness theorem and the Cuntz-Krieger uniqueness theorem.  These are analogous, respectively, to the gauge-invariant uniqueness theorem and Cuntz-Krieger uniqueness theorem for graph C*-algebras.  Formal statements of the uniqueness theorems are as follows:

The Graded Uniqueness Theorem:  Fix a field . Let  be a graph, and let  be the associated Leavitt path algebra.

The Cuntz-Krieger Uniqueness Theorem:   Fix a field . Let  be a graph satisfying Condition (L), and let  be the associated Leavitt path algebra.

Ideal structure
We use the term ideal to mean "two-sided ideal" in our Leavitt path algebras. A subset of vertices  is called hereditary if for all ,  implies .

For any saturated hereditary subset , the ideal  is graded.

Theorem:  Fix a field , and let  be a row-finite graph.  Then the following hold:

References

Algebras
Ring theory